Bhoomiyile Malakha (Angel on Earth) is a 1965 Indian Malayalam-language film, directed and produced by P. A. Thomas. The film stars Prem Nazir and Rajalakshmi, with Sukumari, Lakshmi, Adoor Bhasi and Thikkurissy Sukumaran Nair in supporting roles. The film had musical score by Jaya Vijaya, M. A. Majeed and P. S. Divakar.

Plot

Cast

 Prem Nazir as Sunny
 Rajalakshmi
 Sukumari
 Lakshmi as Chinamma
 Adoor Bhasi
 Thikkurissy Sukumaran Nair
 Kedamangalam Sadanandan
 Muthukulam Raghavan Pillai
 O. Ramdas
 Devidasan
 Jesey
 T. S. Muthaiah
 Aravindakshan
 Gopalan
 Kaduvakulam Antony
 Kalaikkal Kumaran
 Master Shaji Thomas
 Mohan
 Nirmala
 Panjabi
 Paravoor Bharathan
 Sumathi
 T. K. Balachandran
 V. S. Achari
 Vijayan

Soundtrack
The music was composed by Jaya Vijaya, M. A. Majeed and P. S. Divakar and the lyrics were written by Thomas Parannoor, K. C. Muttuchira, K. M. Alavi, Varghese Vadakara and Sreemoolanagaram Vijayan.

References

External links
 

1965 films
1960s Malayalam-language films
Films directed by P. A. Thomas
Films scored by Jaya Vijaya